Albert Herman (1887–1958) was an American actor, screenwriter and film director. Herman was a prolific director, working mainly on low-budget movies for companies such as Producers Releasing Corporation. He is sometimes credited as Al Herman.

Selected filmography

Director

 Sporting Chance (1931)
 Exposed (1932)
 The Big Chance (1933)
 The Whispering Shadow (1933, serial)
 Twisted Rails (1934)
 Hot Off the Press (1935)
 Speed Limited (1935)
 Danger Ahead (1935)
 The Drunkard (1935)
 Bars of Hate (1935)
 Gun Play (1935)
 Big Boy Rides Again (1935)
 Western Frontier (1935)
Million Dollar Haul (1935)
 What Price Crime (1935)
 The Cowboy and the Bandit (1935)
 Trails End (1935)
 Blazing Justice (1936)
 Outlaws of the Range (1936)
 Fugitive in the Sky (Unbilled) (1936)
 The Black Coin (1936, serial)
 The Clutching Hand (1936, serial)
 Valley of Terror (1937)
 Renfrew of the Royal Mounted (1937)
 Rollin' Plains (1938)
 Where the Buffalo Roam (1938)
 Starlight Over Texas (1938)
 On the Great White Trail (1938)
 The Utah Trail (1938)
 Song of the Buckaroo (1938)
 Sundown on the Prairie (1939)
 Rollin' Westward (1939)
 Man from Texas (1939)
 Down the Wyoming Trail (1939)
 The Golden Trail (1940)
 Rhythm of the Rio Grande (1940)
 Pals of the Silver Sage (1940)
 Rainbow Over the Range (1940)
 Roll Wagons Roll (1940)
 Arizona Frontier (1940)
 Take Me Back to Oklahoma (1940)
 Rollin' Home to Texas (1940)
 Gentleman from Dixie (1941)
 The Pioneers (1941)
 Miss V from Moscow (1942)
 A Yank in Libya (1942)
 The Rangers Take Over (1942)
 The Dawn Express (1942)
 Bad Men of Thunder Gap (1943)
 Rogues' Gallery (1944)
 Delinquent Daughters (1944)
 Shake Hands with Murder (1944)
 The Missing Corpse (1945)
 The Phantom of 42nd Street (1945)

Actor
 Talent Scout (1937)
 Swanee River (1939)

References

Bibliography
 Dixon, Wheeler. Producers Releasing Corporation: A Comprehensive Filmography and History. McFarland, 1986.

External links

1887 births
1958 deaths
American film directors
20th-century American screenwriters